Robert Beattie "Bob" Swankie (25 February 1932 – 28 June 2011) was a Scottish former professional association footballer who played as a wing half. He played one match in the Football League for Darlington in 1954.

References

1932 births
2011 deaths
People from Arbroath
Scottish footballers
Association football defenders
Burnley F.C. players
Gloucester City A.F.C. players
Darlington F.C. players
Kidderminster Harriers F.C. players
English Football League players
Footballers from Angus, Scotland